The University of San Jose–Recoletos, also referred to by its acronym USJ–R or to its colloquially shortened name San Jose, is a private Catholic research and coeducational basic and higher education institution run by the   Order of Augustinian Recollects in Cebu City, Cebu, Philippines. It was founded by the Augustinian Recollects in 1947. From classes held in an old building and a portion of a convent, the school built modern structures while retaining classic features.

The university has  three campuses. Two of which are located in different areas of Metro Cebu – the main campus along Corner P. Lopez and Magallanes Streets while the Basak Campus is at Cebu South Road, Basak Pardo, Cebu City. Its third campus, the Balamban Campus, is located in Arpili, a barangay in the Municipality of Balamban (in the province of Cebu).

Background

History 

Established by the Order of Augustinian Recollects in Cebu City in 1947, the then Colegio de San Jose - Recoletos held classes in a portion of a convent, which can be traced back on 1621, and in an old building. On July 25, 1948, CSJ-R's second year marked the blessing of the college building in the then Carmelo Street, now Leon Kilat Street. With the rise of the new building, collegiate courses were offered. Liberal Arts, Education, Commerce, Secretarial, Vocational courses and Pianoforte were the first set of courses offered by CSJ-R in the college level.

The Augustinian Recollects decided to construct a new college building designed by architects Imelda Borromeo and Mariano Monasque. The new San Nicolas Building fronting Plaza Washington (now Freedom Park), was inaugurated on July 25, 1950. The year 1950 also witnessed another milestone in education, breaking free from the old system, the school adopted the system of departmentalized colleges appointing one dean for each college.

In 1955, another structure was added to the ever-expanding CSJ-R, the San Agustin Hall was inaugurated on August 28, 1955. Responding to the needs of the ever-increasing student population, the San Agustin Hall Annex was conceived and later inaugurated on March 19, 1960.

In the year 1965, the Iglesia de la Inmaculada Concepcion, also known as the Iglesia de los Padres Agustinos Recoletos, was demolished after thorough and emotionally charged deliberations as the conservatives of the church fought for its preservation. On the foundations of the old church, a new church would rise and would become known as the Church of Our Lady of Mt. Carmel and was finally blessed on March 18, 1966.

Tragedy struck in March 1967, bringing with it a conflagration which destroyed parts of Colegio de San Jose. The Augustinian Recollects were quick to address this occurrence and by the year 1969, a six-storey building along P. Lopez Street was constructed giving rise to what is now known as the San Jose Building.

In 1980, CSJ-R bought a new site in  Basak Pardo, Cebu City, then built the new building for the grade and high schools, the Recoletos Coliseum, Open Gymnasium and the Pope Paul II Retreat House. In 1996, the Talavera House of Prayer was built in the scenic hills of Quiot Pardo, Cebu City.

June 13, 1981, marked the completion of the CSJ-R Basak Campus; right before achieving university status, school year 1982–1983 saw the transfer of the elementary and high school departments to the CSJ-R Basak Campus. Roughly three years later, the Recoletos Coliseum (now fully air-conditioned) was completed, making June 1984 a significant date for sports enthusiasts.

On September 21, 1984, CSJ-R attained university status. Spanning years of accreditation and re-accreditation, USJ-R, PAASCU Level 3, was granted Autonomous by CHED in 2001.

The curricular programs of USJ-R evolved from traditional to innovative course offerings: Arts and Sciences (started as liberal arts in 1947);  Commerce and Education (founded in 1948); Engineering (1961); Bachelor of Laws (1957); and the Graduate School (1962). In 2003, the College of Information, Computer and Communications Technology was created. The Expanded Tertiary Education Equivalency and Accreditation Program (ETEEAP) followed in the same year. On April 1, 2004, the Vertical Alignment of the undergraduate and graduate schools took effect which established five graduate schools: Graduate School of Business and Management, Graduate School of Arts and Sciences, Graduate School of Information Technology and Computer Studies, Graduate School of Education and Graduate School of Engineering.

In June 2004, the B.S. in Nursing started its first operation due to the huge demand of nurses at the time. The university's College of Nursing held its 1st Capping, Badge Investiture and Candle Lighting Ceremony in June 2006 at the Recoletos Coliseum, Basak Campus.

Part of USJ-R's campaign is the provision of infrastructures and facilities to aid learning. Thus the rise of many school buildings like the Nursing Skills Laboratory, the St. Ezekiel Moreno Building, the International Language Center, the Recoletos Law Center, and the LET and CPA Review Centers were taken into place.

In 2006, the St. Ezekiel Moreno Building was completely established in the Basak Campus exclusive for the College of Information, Computer and Communications Technology (CICCT) and the College of Education (COE).

USJ-R had also opened some of the latest programs: Doctor of Philosophy in English, Master of Arts in Education major in Guidance and Counseling, Master of Media Studies with specialization in Broadcast Media and Journalism, Bachelor of Arts in International Studies, Diploma in advance program in Special Education and the English Language Program for foreign and Filipino students.

The years that followed gave the school opportunities to expand. On November 28, 1998, the 52nd General Chapter held in Granada, Spain, voted for the creation of a new Religious Province in the Philippines dedicated to St. Ezekiel Moreno, OAR. The Recollect Philippine Province, where USJ-R belongs, now stands as the eighth regional cluster of communities of the Order of Augustinian Recollect worldwide.

Furthermore, the USJ-R partnered with the Cebu Industrial Park Developers, Inc. and Tsuneishi Heavy Industries Inc., in the establishment of USJ-R Balamban Campus in the Municipality of Balamban, Cebu and inaugurated on June 22, 2009.

In 2019, the school bought a property in Ormoc City and plans for constructing a campus there are on the talks. If pushed through, it would be the first campus of the institution to be situated outside the island of Cebu.

Academics

The academic and curricular programs below are offered by the different colleges of the university, the following are :
Basic education:
Pre-school
Grade school (Grades 1–6)
Junior high school (Grades 7–10)
Senior high school (Grades 11–12)
Baccalaureate/undergraduate programs and Graduate school:
School of Arts and Sciences
School of Business and Management
School of Education
School of Engineering
School of Computer Studies
School of Allied Medical Sciences
Law:
School of Law
TESDA-accredited programs:
Recoletos Industrial and Technological Training Center (RITTC)

Campuses

Main Campus 
Location: Corner P. Lopez and Magallanes Sts., Cebu City, Cebu, Philippines

Departments and Colleges: School of Arts & Sciences; School of Business and Management; School of Engineering; School of Allied Medical Sciences; School of Law; Senior High School

Buildings

 San Jose Building
 San Agustin Building
 San Nicolas Building
 Mount Carmel Building

Basak Campus 
Location: N. Bacalso Ave. (Cebu South Road), Basak Pardo, Cebu City, Cebu, Philippines

Departments and Colleges: Basic Education Department; Senior High School; School of Education; School of Computer Studies; RITTC

Buildings

 St. Pius X Building
 Our Lady of Consolation Building
 Saint Ezekiel Moreno Building
Nuestra Señora de la Salud Building
 The Recoletos Coliseum

USJ-R's Basak Campus houses the Recoletos Coliseum and a soccer field. Intramural events are mostly done in Basak Campus. The soccer field also serves as marching and demonstration ground for boy scouts, girl scouts, and students undergoing civic welfare and reserve officers training.

Balamban Campus 
Location: Arpili, Balamban, Cebu, Philippines

Departments and Colleges: Basic Education Department; Senior High School; RITTC

The Balamban Campus hosts a gymnasium, a separate building for the chapel and another for the auditorium. A swimming pool and open gym were also constructed. In addition to this, an exclusive dormitory named The Nicopolis was constructed in the Balamban Campus. Buildings for the high school, grade school and potential college departments were also constructed.

Administrators (2022-present) 

 Rev. Fr. Eduardo S. Celiz Jr., OAR (University President)
 Rev. Fr. Antonio S. Limchaypo, OAR (VP – Administration / concurrently Director, Campus Ministry Office - Basak Campus; and Adviser, Alumni Association)
 Rev. Fr. Leo G. Alaras, OAR (VP – Academics and Research)
 Rev. Fr. Leopoldo V. Estioko, OAR (VP – Business and Finance / concurrently Director, Scholarship Center; and Recoletos de Cebu Community Prior)
 Rev. Fr. Persuiz Joseph M. Decena, OAR (VP – Identity, Mission and Formation / concurrently Director, Basic Education)
Rev. Fr. Rouel M. Sia, OAR (Director, Campus Ministry Office - Main Campus; Director, Institute of Non-Formal Education and Community Outreach Program; Director, ARCORES Filipinas; and Adviser, Alumni Association)
 Rev. Fr. Glynn C. Ortega, OAR (Director, Student Welfare; Sports Moderator; and Health Services Moderator)
 Rev. Fr. Leander V. Barrot, OAR (Property Administrator; and Director, Talavera House of Prayer)
 Rev. Fr. William Emilito C. Villaflor, OAR (Consultant, VP – Finance/Property Administrator Office)
 Rev. Fr. Hernando D. Coja, OAR (Director, Center for Religious Education; Director, NSTP; and Administrator, Safety and Security Department)

Order of Augustinian Recollects (OAR) sister schools 

 University of Negros Occidental – Recoletos (Bacolod)
 San Sebastian College–Recoletos (Manila)
 San Sebastian College–Recoletos de Manila, Canlubang satellite campus (Calamba, Laguna)
 San Sebastian College–Recoletos de Cavite
 Colegio de Santo Tomas – Recoletos (San Carlos City, Negros Occidental)
 Colegio de San Pedro–Recoletos (Poblacion, Valencia, Negros Oriental)
 San Pedro Academy–Recoletos (Caidiocan, Valencia, Negros Oriental)
 Colegio San Nicolas de Tolentino–Recoletos (formerly UNO-R High School Talisay Branch) (Talisay City, Negros Occidental)

Seminary and Formation Houses
 Santo Tomas de Villanueva Recoletos Formation House (High School) (San Carlos City, Negros Occidental)
 Casiciaco Recoleos Seminary (formerly Seminario Mayor - Recoletos de Baguio) (Philosophy) (Baguio)
 Recoletos Formation Center (Theology) (Mira-Nila Homes, Quezon City)

Notable alumni
Isabelo "Jojo" Lastimosa, Jr. – former professional basketball player and currently an assistant coach on PBA; studied Computer Science
Luke Mejares – singer; studied AB English major in Marketing Studies
Jamie Herrell – studied Mass Communication (Miss Earth 2014)
Gazini Ganados – studied Tourism Management (Miss Universe Philippines 2019)
Isabel Oli – actress; studied Information Technology
Diva Montelaba – actress; studied Tourism Management
Akiko Solon – singer-actress; studied Mass Communication
Anna Fegi – singer; studied Mass Communication
Beatrice Gomez – studied Mass Communication (Miss Universe Philippines 2021)
Leo Lastimosa – studied Political Science; tri-media journalist
Abet Guidaben – former PBA player; 2 time most valuable player; member PBA 25 Greatest Players

References

External links 
 University of San Jose–Recoletos Official Website
 Recoletos Communications, Inc.
 University Profile (Video Streaming)
 
 Twitter updates
 LinkedIn Alumni Network
 USJ-R Blogspot
 FORWARD Publication on Facebook (USJ-R's Official Student Publication)
 Official Youtube Channel

Educational institutions established in 1947
Augustinian schools
Augustinian universities and colleges
San Jose - Recoletos, University of
Universities and colleges in Cebu City
Catholic elementary schools in the Philippines
Catholic secondary schools in the Philippines
1947 establishments in the Philippines